Gastrodia crebriflora, commonly known as dense potato orchid, is a leafless terrestrial mycotrophic orchid in the family Orchidaceae. It has a pale brown flowering stem and up to thirty five crowded, drooping, white to pale brown flowers. It is only known from the Blackdown Tableland in Queensland, Australia.

Description 
Gastrodia crebriflora is a leafless terrestrial, mycotrophic herb that has a shiny, fleshy, pale brown flowering stem bearing ten and thirty five flowers pale brown to white, drooping, tube-shaped flowers. The tube has a warty base and is white inside. Flowering occurs from September to October but the flowers are self-pollinating and short-lived.

Taxonomy and naming
Gastrodia crebriflora was first formally described in 1991 by David Jones from a specimen collected on the Blackdown Tableland in 1988. The description was published in Australian Orchid Research. The specific epithet (crebriflora) is derived from the Latin words creber meaning "thick", "close" or "numerous" and flos meaning "flower", referring to the many crowded flowers on this orchid.

Distribution and habitat
The dense potato orchid grows in loose groups in tall forest on the Blackdown Tableland.

Conservation
This orchid is classed as "vulnerable" under the Queensland Government Nature Conservation Act 1992.

References 

crebriflora
Plants described in 1991
Terrestrial orchids
Orchids of Queensland